Maxim Van Gils (born 25 November 1999) is a Belgian cyclist, who currently rides for UCI WorldTeam .

Major results
2017
 1st La Classique des Alpes Juniors
2019
 6th Overall Circuit des Ardennes
 10th Eschborn–Frankfurt Under–23
2020
 3rd Overall Tour de Savoie Mont-Blanc
 4th Overall Giro della Regione Friuli Venezia Giulia
2021
 7th Overall Tour de Wallonie
2022
 1st  Overall Saudi Tour
1st  Young rider classification
1st Stage 4
 5th Japan Cup
 7th Overall Tour de Wallonie
2023
 5th Muscat Classic
 6th Overall Tour of Oman

Grand Tour general classification results timeline

References

External links

1999 births
Living people
Belgian male cyclists
People from Brasschaat
Cyclists from Antwerp Province
21st-century Belgian people